The Communauté de communes de Petite-Camargue is a federation of municipalities (communauté de communes) in the Gard département and in the Occitanie région of France. Its seat is Vauvert. Its area is 203.6 km2, and its population was 26,997 in 2018.

Composition
The communauté de communes consists of the following 5 communes:
 Aimargues
 Aubord
 Beauvoisin
 Le Cailar
 Vauvert

Administration

Presidents 
 Jean Denat, (PS, 2001–2002)
 Reine Bouvier (Divers gauche, 2002–2014)
 Jean-Paul Franc (independent politician, 2014–2020)
 André Brundu (2020–)

See also 
 Communes of the Gard department

References

Commune communities in France
Intercommunalities of Gard